Apostolos Charalampidis (born 4 July 1968) is a Greek professional football manager.

References

1968 births
Living people
Greek football managers
Greek expatriate football managers
Veria F.C. managers
Kallithea F.C. managers
Doxa Drama F.C. managers
Niki Volos F.C. managers
Nea Salamis Famagusta FC managers
Kavala F.C. managers
Olympiacos Volos F.C. managers
Asteras Tripolis F.C. managers
Panserraikos F.C. managers
Aiginiakos F.C. managers
Aittitos Spata F.C. managers
A.E. Karaiskakis F.C. managers
Ionikos F.C. managers
Expatriate football managers in Cyprus
Greek expatriate sportspeople in Cyprus
Footballers from Kastoria